Mars pistol can refer to :

 Webley Mars - an early British semi-automatic pistol
 Bergmann Mars - an early German semi-automatic pistol